The 2016 Toulon Tournament was the 44th edition of the Toulon Tournament. It took place 18–29 May 2016. The tournament was used by several teams as preparation for the 2016 Summer Olympics. The tournament was won by England.

Participants

AFC

CAF

CONCACAF

UEFA

CONMEBOL

Notes
 Nigeria withdrew in April 2016 due to lack of funding.

Venues

Squads

Group stage

Group A

Group B

Knockout stage

Third place playoff

Final

Goalscorers
4 goals
 Lewis Baker
3 goals

 Sehrou Guirassy
 Ruben Loftus-Cheek

2 goals

 Matěj Pulkrab
 Jack Grealish
 Nathan Redmond
 Cauley Woodrow
 Jonathan Bamba
 Souleymane Diarra
 Adama Niane
 Diadie Samassékou
 Alfonso González
 Carlos Fierro
 Sergio Díaz
 Pedro Rodrigues

1 goal

 Kiril Despodov
 Jakub Fulnek
 Dominik Preisler
 James Ward-Prowse
 Abdou Diallo
 Dylan Batubinsika
 Thomas Robinet
 Sébastien Salles-Lamonge
 Thierno Diallo
 Mamadou Guirassy
 Bangaly Soumah
 Takuma Asano
 Takumi Minamino
 Cayman Togashi
 Ibrahima Tandia
 Rosario Cota
 Jordan Silva
 Omar Alderete
 Richard Britez
 Pedro Báez
 Romário Baldé
 André Horta
 João Pedro
 Alexandre Silva 
 Diogo Verdasca

Own goals

  Souleymane Makadji (against England)

References

External links
Toulon Tournament

 
2016
2015–16 in French football
2016 in youth association football
May 2016 sports events in France